California, Cincinnati is a small neighborhood in the city of Cincinnati, also commonly called Grove Park, after Coney Island's original name. It is located at the confluence of the Little Miami River and Ohio River. Because of this, many of its historical homes have water damage. It is not uncommon to see a home with two or three stories only being inhabited on the uppermost story.  It is also the location of the Greater Cincinnati Water Works' main treatment plant.  California borders the Cincinnati neighborhoods of Mt. Washington and the East End, as well as Anderson Township.

The community was named after the state of California. California was annexed by the City of Cincinnati in 1909.

The population was 944 at the 2020 census.

Landmarks
California has earned the nickname "Cincinnati's Playland" because of its many recreation destinations. These include:
Coney Island
Riverbend Music Center
Belterra Park Gaming & Entertainment Center
California Woods nature preserve

Notable person
Brice Disque, business executive and soldier

References

Neighborhoods in Cincinnati